American country artist and television host Trisha Yearwood has received more than 58 award nominations and 10 wins. Yearwood has been nominated a total of 27 times from the Grammy Awards. Her first award from the association came in 1994 for her performance of "I Fall to Pieces", which won her and Aaron Neville the Best Country Collaboration with Vocals accolade. In 1997, she won both the award for Best Female Country Vocal Performance and the Best Country Collaboration with Vocals award. In addition, Yearwood has been given accolades from the Academy of Country Music. She won her first award in 1991 for Top Female Vocalist. She later won in both 1997 and 1998 for Top Female Vocalist. Yearwood has also won three accolades from the Country Music Association, including Female Vocalist of the Year. As a host of the Food Network television show Trisha's Southern Kitchen, Yearwood has been nominated for (and won) the Daytime Emmy Award for Outstanding Culinary Program.

American Music Awards

!
|-
| rowspan="2"| 1992
| Trisha Yearwood
| Favorite New Country Artist
| 
| style="text-align:center;"|
|-
| "She's in Love with the Boy"
| Favorite Country Song
| 
| style="text-align:center;"|
|-
| 1998
| (Songbook) A Collection of Hits
| Favorite Country Album
| 
| style="text-align:center;"|
|-
|}

Academy of Country Music Awards

!
|-
| rowspan="2"| 1991
| Trisha Yearwood
| Top New Female Vocalist
| 
| style="text-align:center;" rowspan="13"|
|-
| "She's in Love with the Boy"
| Single Record of the Year
| 
|-
| 1993
| Common Thread: The Songs of the Eagles
| Album of the Year
| 
|-
| 1994
| Trisha Yearwood & Aaron Neville
| Top Vocal Duet
| 
|-
| 1996
| Trisha Yearwood
| Top Female Vocalist
| 
|-
| rowspan="4"| 1997
| "In Another's Eyes" 
| Vocal Event of the Year
| 
|-
| Trisha Yearwood
| Top Female Vocalist
| 
|-
| rowspan="2"| "How Do I Live"
| Song of the Year
| 
|-
| Single Record of the Year
| 
|-
| 1998
| rowspan="2"| Trisha Yearwood
| rowspan="2"| Top Female Vocalist
| 
|-
| 2001
| 
|-
| 2008
| "Another Try" 
| Vocal Event of the Year
| 
|-
| 2016
| "Forever Country"
| Video of the Year
| 
|}

Country Music Association Awards

!
|-
| rowspan="2"| 1992
| Trisha Yearwood
| Female Vocalist of the Year
| 
| style="text-align:center;" rowspan="19"|
|-
| rowspan="2"| Trisha Yearwood
| rowspan="2"| Horizon Award
| 
|-
| rowspan="2"| 1993
| 
|-
| "Walkaway Joe" 
| Vocal Event of the Year
| 
|-
| rowspan="3"| 1994
| Common Thread: The Songs of the Eagles
| Album of the Year
| 
|-
| Trisha Yearwood
| Female Vocalist of the Year
| 
|-
| "I Fall to Pieces" 
| Vocal Event of the Year
| 
|-
| 1996
| "On My Own" 
| Vocal Event of the Year
| 
|-
| rowspan="2"| 1997
| Everybody Knows
| Album of the Year
| 
|-
| rowspan="2"| Trisha Yearwood
| rowspan="2"| Female Vocalist of the Year
| 
|-
| rowspan="2"| 1998
| 
|-
| "In Another's Eyes" 
| Vocal Event of the Year
| 
|-
| rowspan="2"| 1999
| Where Your Road Leads
| Album of the Year
| 
|-
| rowspan="3"| Trisha Yearwood
| rowspan="3"| Female Vocalist of the Year
| 
|-
| 2000
| 
|-
| rowspan="2"| 2001
| 
|-
| "I Would've Loved You Anyway"
| Music Video of the Year 
| 
|-
| 2002
| Trisha Yearwood
| Female Vocalist of the Year
| 
|-
| 2008
| "Another Try" 
| Vocal Event of the Year
| 
|-
|}

Daytime Emmy Awards 

!
|-
| 2013
| rowspan="2"| Trisha's Southern Kitchen
| rowspan="2"| Outstanding Culinary Program
| 
| style="text-align:center;"|
|-
| 2017
| 
| style="text-align:center;"| 
|-
|}

Grammy Awards 

!
|-
| 1991
| "She's in Love with the Boy"
| rowspan="2"| Best Female Country Vocal Performance
| 
| style="text-align:center;" rowspan="25"|
|-
| 1993
| "Walkaway Joe"
| 
|-
| rowspan="2"| 1994
| "I Fall to Pieces" 
| Best Country Collaboration with Vocals
| 
|-
| The Song Remembers When
| rowspan="2"| Best Country Album
| 
|-
| rowspan="2"| 1995
| Thinkin' About You
| 
|-
| "On My Own" 
| Best Country Collaboration with Vocals
| 
|-
| rowspan="3"| 1996
| "Believe Me Baby (I Lied)"
| Best Female Country Vocal Performance
| 
|-
| Everybody Knows
| Best Country Album
| 
|-
| "Hope: Country Music's Quest for a Cure" 
| Best Country Collaboration with Vocals 
| 
|-
| rowspan="2"| 1997
| "How Do I Live"
| Best Female Country Vocal Performance
| 
|-
| "In Another's Eyes" 
| Best Country Collaboration with Vocals
| 
|-
| rowspan="3"| 1998
| "There Goes My Baby"
| Best Female Country Vocal Performance
| 
|-
| Where Your Road Leads
| Best Country Album
| 
|-
| "Where Your Road Leads" 
| Best Country Collaboration with Vocals
| 
|-
| rowspan="2"| 2000
| "Real Live Woman
| Best Female Country Vocal Performance
| 
|-
| Real Live Woman
| Best Country Album
| 
|-
| rowspan="3"| 2001
| "I Would've Loved You Anyway"
| Best Female Country Vocal Performance
| 
|-
| Inside Out
| Best Country Album
| 
|-
| "Inside Out" 
| Best Country Collaboration with Vocals
| 
|-
| 2002
| "Squeeze Me In" 
| Best Country Collaboration with Vocals
| 
|-
| rowspan="2"| 2005
| "Georgia Rain"
| Best Female Country Vocal Performance
| 
|-
| Jasper County
| Best Country Album
| 
|-
| 2006
| "Love Will Always Win" 
| Best Country Collaboration with Vocals
| 
|-
| 2007
| "Heaven, Heartache and the Power of Love"
| rowspan="2"| Best Female Country Vocal Performance
| 
|-
| rowspan="3"| 2008
| "This Is Me You're Talking To"
| 
|-
| "Let the Wind Chase You" 
| Best Country Collaboration with Vocals
| 
|-
| Heaven, Heartache and the Power of Love
| Best Country Album
| 
|-
|}

References 

Yearwood, Trisha